Krasnyi Kut may refer to the following places in Ukraine:

Krasnyi Kut, Donetsk Oblast, village in Kramatorsk Raion
Krasnyi Kut, Luhansk Oblast, urban-type settlement in Antratsyt Raion